The Abrolhos tragedy is the only English translation of Isaac Commelin's 1647 , which was the first published account of the 1629 shipwreck of  in the Houtman Abrolhos, and the subsequent mutiny and massacre that occurred amongst the survivors.

The translations was eventually published in the 1897 "Christmas Edition" (24 December) of Western Australia's The Western Mail.

The Abrolhos tragedy is credited with having greatly increased interest in the Batavia incident in Australia. Specifically, Henrietta Drake-Brockman credits it with having fed her fascination with the incident—a fascination that ultimately resulted in her undertaking and publishing research that was key to the discovery of the wreck.

See also
 Wiebbe Hayes

References

External links
 Pelsaert, Batavia, 1629 Facsimile of  [Pelsaert Journal].
 English translation of Ongeluckige voyagie, van't schip Batavia

1897 books
Western Australian literature
Batavia (1628 ship)
History books about the Dutch Empire
Works about the Dutch East India Company